Jean-François Le Gall (born 15 November 1959) is a French mathematician working in areas of probability theory such as Brownian motion, Lévy processes, superprocesses and their connections with partial differential equations, the Brownian snake, random trees, branching processes, stochastic coalescence and random planar maps.  He received his Ph.D. in 1982 from Pierre and Marie Curie University (Paris VI) under the supervision of Marc Yor.  He is currently professor at the University of Paris-Sud in Orsay and is a senior member of the Institut universitaire de France. He was elected to French academy of sciences, December 2013.

He was awarded the Rollo Davidson Prize in 1986, the Loève Prize in 1997, and the Fermat Prize in 2005. He was the thesis advisor of at least 11 students including Wendelin Werner. For 2019 he received the Wolf Prize in Mathematics. and for 2021 he was awarded the BBVA Foundation Frontiers of Knowledge Award in Basic Sciences.

Books
Le Gall, Jean-François,  Spatial branching processes, random snakes and partial differential equations. Lectures in Mathematics ETH Zürich. Birkhäuser Verlag, Basel (1999). 163 pp. 
Le Gall, Jean-François,  Brownian Motion, Martingales, and Stochastic Calculus. Graduate Texts in Mathematics. Springer International Publishing Switzerland (2016).

References

External links
 professional page

20th-century French mathematicians
21st-century French mathematicians
Academic staff of Paris-Sud University
Probability theorists
École Normale Supérieure alumni
Members of the French Academy of Sciences
Living people
1959 births
People from Morlaix
Pierre and Marie Curie University alumni
Probability Theory and Related Fields editors